Gwyneth Denver Davies  (born 1959), known professionally as Gwyneth Lewis, is a Welsh poet, who was the inaugural National Poet of Wales in 2005. She wrote the text that appears over the Wales Millennium Centre.

Biography
Gwyneth Lewis was born into a Welsh-speaking family in Cardiff. Her father started teaching her English when her mother went into hospital to give birth to her sister.

Lewis attended Ysgol Gyfun Rhydfelen, a bilingual school near Pontypridd, and then studied at Girton College, Cambridge, University of Cambridge, where she was a member of Cymdeithas Y Mabinogi. She was awarded a double first in English literature and the Laurie Hart Prize for outstanding intellectual work. Lewis then studied creative writing at Columbia and Harvard, before receiving a D. Phil in English from Balliol College, Oxford, for a thesis on 18th-century literary forgery featuring the work of Iolo Morganwg.

Lewis was made a Harkness Fellow and worked as a freelance journalist in New York for three years. She then returned to Cardiff as a documentary producer and director at BBC Wales. She left the BBC in 2001 after receiving a £75,000 grant from the National Endowment for Science, Technology and the Arts to carry out research and sail to ports linked historically with the inhabitants of her native Cardiff.

Lewis later wrote the words which appear over the Wales Millennium Centre, which opened in November 2004. The same words form the title of Karl Jenkins's cantata In These Stones Horizons Sing, which is partly set to lyrics by Gwyneth Lewis. In 2005 she was elected Honorary Fellow of Cardiff University. The same year she was made the first National Poet of Wales.

Lewis was a judge for the 2011 Hippocrates Prize for Poetry and Medicine. On 6 August 2012, Gwyneth Lewis won Y Goron (the Crown) at the National Eisteddfod at Llandow for a collection of poems on the set title of Ynys (Island).

Lewis was appointed Member of the Order of the British Empire (MBE) in the 2022 Birthday Honours for services to literature.

Music
Lewis entered the world of music in partnership with Richard Chew. Redflight/ Barcud was her first libretto, commissioned and presented by Welsh National Opera with pupils from Ysgol Capel y Cynfab, Cynghordy and Ysgol Cil-y-cwm. The Most Beautiful Man from the Sea is an oratorio for 600 voices, with music by Chew and Orlando Gough. It was given its world première at the Wales Millennium Centre by the Chorus of Welsh National Opera and 500 amateur singers.

Personal life
Married to Leighton, a former bosun with the Merchant Navy, Lewis has had a well documented battle in the past with clinical depression and alcoholism. Her personal battles inspired her first book, Sunbathing in the Rain: A Cheerful Book on Depression and also a collection of poems, Keeping Mum – Voices from Therapy.

Having agreed to change their lifestyles for their own good, Lewis and her husband bought the small yacht Jameeleh, taught themselves to sail, and set out to cross the Ocean to Africa. The journey inspired her 2005 book Two in a Boat – The True Story of a Marital Rite of Passage.

Bibliography

Llwybrau bywyd – Urdd Gobaith Cymru, 1977
Ar y groesffordd – Urdd Gobaith Cymru, 1978
Sonedau Redsa a Cherddi Eraill – Gomer, 1990
Parables and Faxes – Bloodaxe, 1995
Cyfrif Un Ac Un yn Dri – Barddas, 1996
Zero Gravity – Bloodaxe, 1998. Inspired by an astronaut cousin's voyage to repair the Hubble Space Telescope. The BBC later based a documentary on the poetry.
Y Llofrudd Iaith – Barddas, 2000: won the Welsh Arts Council Book of the Year Prize.
Sunbathing in the Rain: A Cheerful Book on Depression – Flamingo, 2002
Keeping Mum (republished in 2005 as Chaotic Angels) – Bloodaxe, 2003
Two In A Boat: A Marital Voyage – Fourth Estate, 2005. Recounts a voyage with her husband on a small boat from Cardiff to North Africa, during which her husband was diagnosed with cancer.
A Hospital Odyssey – Bloodaxe, 2010
The Meat Tree – Seren, 2010
Sparrow Tree – Bloodaxe, 2011 
Y Storm, 2012. Lewis's translation of Shakespeare's The Tempest)

Prizes and awards
Current list of prizes and awards:
1977 – Literary Medal at the Urdd Gobaith Cymru
1978 – Literary Medal at the Urdd Gobaith Cymru
1988 – Eric Gregory Award
1995 – Aldeburgh Poetry Festival Prize Parables and Faxes
1995 – Forward Poetry Prize (Best First Collection) (shortlist) Parables and Faxes
1998 – Forward Poetry Prize (Best Poetry Collection of the Year) (shortlist) Zero Gravity
2000 – Arts Council of Wales Book of the Year Award Y Llofrudd Iaith
2001 – National Endowment for Science, Technology and the Arts (NESTA) Award

References

External links
Gwyneth Lewis personal website
Bio at ContemporaryWriters.com
Gwyneth Lewis profile at BBC Wales
Listen to Gwyneth Lewis reading her poetry – a British Library recording, 12 July 2010.

1959 births
Living people
20th-century British journalists
21st-century British journalists
20th-century Welsh poets
20th-century Welsh women writers
21st-century Welsh poets
21st-century Welsh women writers
21st-century Welsh writers
Writers from Cardiff
Alumni of Girton College, Cambridge
Harvard University alumni
Columbia University School of the Arts alumni
Alumni of Balliol College, Oxford
Welsh journalists
Harkness Fellows
Welsh women poets
BBC newsreaders and journalists
Fellows of the Royal Society of Literature
People educated at Ysgol Gyfun Garth Olwg
British women television journalists
British women radio presenters
Welsh women journalists
Welsh women radio presenters
Members of the Order of the British Empire